Przepis na życie (English Recipe For Life) is a Polish Comedy-drama television series produced by Akson Studio for the TVN network. The series was created and written by Polish actress Agnieszka Pilaszewska. The main character is a middle-aged woman whose life changes when her husband leaves her and she loses her job. The only activity that can make her feel better is cooking. This is her passion. The storyline follows her fate, as well as her daughter's and ex-husband's who is now with another woman.

Cast 
 Magdalena Kumorek as Anka Zawadzka
 Aleksandra Radwańska as Mania Zawadzka
 Dorota Kolak as Irena
 Piotr Adamczyk as' Andrzej Zawadzki
 Edyta Olszówka as Pola
 Maja Ostaszewska as Beata Darmieta
 Dominika Gwit as Gruba
 Paweł Marczuk as Grochol
 Borys Szyc as Jerzy Knape
 Lesław Żurek as Maciek
 Jakub Mazurek as Leszek
 Iwona Bielska as Wanda
 Wojciech Duryasz as Karol
 Sławomir Orzechowski as Stefan
 Jerzy Fedorowicz as General, Beata's father

 List of episodes 

 Ratings 

International broadcast
Following the success in Poland, broadcast rights have been sold abroad. The series currently airs in China, Hungary, Slovakia and the countries of Middle East.

Lithuanian version
The Lithuanian version of the series titled Gyvenimo receptai'', featuring Donata Rinkevičienė, Inga Norkutė, Kristina Kazlauskaitė, Giedrius Arbačiauskas, Ridas Žirgulis, Lina Rastokaitė, Paulius Ignatavičius and Eglė Špokaitė as the main cast, will premiere on 10 September 2014 on LNK.

References

External links 
 Official site
 
Przepis na życie at Distribution.tvn.pl (English)

Polish comedy-drama television series